Mothers Cry is a 1930 American pre-Code drama film released by First National Pictures, a subsidiary of Warner Bros., and directed by Hobart Henley. The movie stars Dorothy Peterson, Helen Chandler, David Manners, Evalyn Knapp and Sidney Blackmer. The film is based on the popular novel of the same name written by Helen Grace Carlisle.

Plot
The film is focused on the life of widowed mother Mary Williams (Dorothy Peterson) and her struggles to raise her four children. Daniel (Edward Woods), her eldest, torments her and his siblings throughout his childhood and grows up to be a criminal. Younger son Arthur (David Manners) grows up to be a successful architect. Daughter Jennie (Evalyn Knapp) loves domestic work and homelife and is courted by Karl Muller (Reinhold Pasch), a wealthy older gentleman. The other daughter, Beattie (Helen Chandler), grows up to be an idealistic dreamer.

One day Daniel doublecrosses some gangsters, who beat him up, and he disappears for three years, returning with a moll whom he introduces as his wife. Meanwhile, Jennie has married Muller. Detectives trail Daniel to his mother's house as a suspect in a holdup and he's sent to prison. Daniel's return drives away Beattie, who ends up doing secretarial work at a Palm Beach hotel. There, she is seduced by a married man, who later pays her off to leave. Daniel reappears at the house with a blackmail scheme and ends up shooting and murdering his own sister Beattie. He is convicted of cold-blooded murder and sent to the electric chair. The film ends with Mary finding consolation in her two remaining children.

Cast
 Dorothy Peterson as Mary Williams
 Helen Chandler as Beattie Williams
 David Manners as Arthur 'Artie' Williams
 Evalyn Knapp as Jenny Williams
 Sidney Blackmer as Mr. Gerald Hart
 Edward Woods as Daniel 'Danny' Williams
 Jean Laverty as Sadye Noonan Williams
 Patrick H. O'Malley, Jr. as Frank Williams

Preservation
A censored version of this film survives, prepared for re-release after June 1934 to remove pre-code material, which is missing at least two minutes of footage. This version has been broadcast on television and cable. The film has been released on DVD by the Warner Archive Collection.

The Library of Congress has long held a copy of the surviving version of this film.

References
Notes

External links
 
 
 
 

1930 films
First National Pictures films
1930s English-language films
Warner Bros. films
American black-and-white films
Films produced by Robert North
American drama films
1930 drama films
1930s American films